Caravan Beyond Redemption is the fifth album of British doom metal band Cathedral, released on 6 December 1998 by Earache.

Track listing

Personnel

Cathedral
 Lee Dorrian – vocals
 Garry Jennings – guitar
 Leo Smee – bass
 Brian Dixon – drums

Technical personnel
 Andy Sneap – production
 Danny Sprigg – assistant engineering
 Stevie Clow – assistant engineering
 Stu Williamson – photography

References

1998 albums
Cathedral (band) albums
Albums produced by Andy Sneap
Earache Records albums